The 2021 Tenerife Ladies Open was a women's tennis tournament played on outdoor hard courts. It was the first edition of the Tenerife Ladies Open, and part of the WTA 250 series of the 2021 WTA Tour. It was held at the Abama Tennis Academy in Guía de Isora, Spain, from 18 until 24 October 2021.

Champions

Singles

  Ann Li def.  Camila Osorio 6–1, 6–4
This is Li's first career WTA title.

Doubles

  Ulrikke Eikeri /  Ellen Perez def.  Lyudmyla Kichenok /  Marta Kostyuk, 6–3, 6–3

Singles main draw entrants

Seeds

 Rankings are as of October 4, 2021.

Other entrants
The following players received wildcards into the main draw:
  Rebeka Masarova
  Nuria Párrizas Díaz
  Lucrezia Stefanini
 
The following player received entry using a protected ranking:
  Zheng Saisai

The following players received entry from the qualifying draw:
  Aliona Bolsova
  Jaqueline Cristian 
  Mandy Minella 
  Donna Vekić
  Stefanie Vögele 
  Wang Xinyu

The following player received entry as a lucky loser:
  Kaja Juvan

Withdrawals
Before the tournament
  Caroline Garcia → replaced by  Arantxa Rus
  Magda Linette → replaced by  Greet Minnen
  Jasmine Paolini → replaced by  Danka Kovinić
  Rebecca Peterson → replaced by  Kaja Juvan
  Martina Trevisan → replaced by  Varvara Gracheva

Doubles main draw entrants

Seeds

Rankings are as of October 4, 2021.

Other entrants
The following pairs received wildcards into the doubles main draw:
  Paula Arias Manjón /  Sara Sorribes Tormo 
  Cristiana Ferrando /  Lucrezia Stefanini

The following pair received entry using a protected ranking:
  Beatrice Gumulya /  Peangtarn Plipuech

Withdrawals
Before the tournament
  Kirsten Flipkens /  Hsieh Su-wei → replaced by  Emina Bektas /  Tara Moore
  Vivian Heisen /  Kimberley Zimmermann → replaced by  Vivian Heisen /  Andreea Mitu
  Greet Minnen /  Alison Van Uytvanck → replaced by  Beatrice Gumulya /  Peangtarn Plipuech
  Andreea Mitu /  Lesley Pattinama Kerkhove → replaced by  Anna Bondár /  Dalma Gálfi

References

External links
Official website
WTA Official website

Tenerife Ladies Open
2021 in Spain
2021 in Spanish tennis
Tenerife Ladies Open